Norris Green is a Liverpool City Council Ward in the Liverpool West Derby Parliamentary constituency. It was formed for the 2004 Municipal elections from the former Pirrie, Clubmoor, Fazakerley and Gillmoss wards.

Councillors
The ward has returned six councillors.

 indicates seat up for re-election after boundary changes.

 indicates seat up for re-election.

 indicates change in affiliation.

 indicates seat up for re-election after casual vacancy.

Election results

Elections of the 2010s

Elections of the 2000s

After the boundary change of 2004 the whole of Liverpool City Council faced election. Three Councillors were returned.

• italics - Denotes the sitting Councillor.
• bold - Denotes the winning candidate.

References

External links
 Liverpool City Council: Ward profile

Wards of Liverpool